Journeys in Africa is a thirteen part series hosted by Bill Ball featuring Africa's wildlife and culture. A travelogue that explores the African continent, including big cities and small villages. The first season premiered September 5, 2013 and the second season premiered January 7, 2015.

Episodes

References

Travel television series
2013 American television series debuts
Television shows set in Africa 
Television episodes set in South Africa